Kenneth Wilfred Baker, Baron Baker of Dorking,  (born 3 November 1934) is a British politician, a former Conservative Member of Parliament and cabinet minister, including holding the offices of Home Secretary, Education Secretary and Conservative Party Chairman. He is a life member of the Tory Reform Group.

Early life
The son of a civil servant, Baker was born in Newport, Monmouthshire. He was educated at Hampton Grammar School between 1946 and 1948, a boys' voluntary aided school in West London (now Hampton School, an independent school). He then went on to study at St Paul's School, a boys' public school then in Hammersmith, London and at Magdalen College, Oxford, where he graduated in 1958 with a BA Degree in History. Whilst at Oxford, Baker served as Secretary of The Oxford Union. Four years later he graduated with a MSc degree in International Law and Regulations. He did National Service in the Royal Artillery, reaching the rank of lieutenant, and worked for Royal Dutch Shell before being elected as a Member of Parliament at a by-election in March 1968.

Career

Political career

Member of Parliament 
Having unsuccessfully contested Poplar in 1964 and Acton in 1966, Baker was first elected to Parliament when he won Acton at a March 1968 by-election, gaining it from Labour following the suicide of Bernard Floud. However, at the 1970 general election he was defeated by Labour's Nigel Spearing. At an ensuing by-election, held on 22 October 1970—caused by the elevation to the Lords (as a life peer) of Quintin Hogg, so that he could become Lord Chancellor after the surprise Conservative victory at the 1970 election—Baker was elected for the safe Conservative seat of St Marylebone in central London. In the parliamentary seat redistribution of the early 1980s, St Marylebone was abolished and Baker was defeated by Peter Brooke for the Conservative nomination at the nearby new safe seat of Cities of London & Westminster. However he successfully obtained nomination at Mole Valley, a safely-Conservative rural seat in Surrey, which he held until his retirement in 1997. He was succeeded there by Sir Paul Beresford.

Early ministerial career 
Baker's first government post was in the Heath ministry; in 1972 he became Parliamentary Secretary at the Civil Service Department, and in 1974 Parliamentary Private Secretary to Edward Heath. Having become closely associated with Heath, he was overlooked for office when Margaret Thatcher became Prime Minister in 1979, but in 1981 he was appointed Minister for Information Technology, in the then Department of Trade and Industry. Having been sworn of the Privy Council in the 1984 New Year Honours, he entered the Cabinet as Secretary of State for the Environment in 1985.

Education Secretary 
Baker served as Secretary of State for Education from 1986 to 1989. His most noted action in his time at the Department of Education was the introduction of the controversial "National Curriculum" through the 1988 Education Act. He also introduced in-service training days for teachers, which became popularly known as "Baker days". At this time Baker was often tipped as a future Conservative leader, including in the 1987 edition of Julian Critchley's biography of Michael Heseltine. Critchley quoted one journalist's witticism "I have seen the future and it smirks" (a reference to the famous line "I have seen the future and it works" written by Lincoln Steffens, an American visitor to Lenin's USSR in 1921). Baker's mannerisms were unpopular with some people: he dressed his hair with Brylcreem, and by the late 1980s he had come to be portrayed by the satirical programme Spitting Image as a slimy slug.

Party Chairman 
In the July 1989 reshuffle Baker was appointed Chairman of the Conservative Party, with the intention that he should organise a fourth consecutive General Election victory for Margaret Thatcher. He managed to steer the government through the otherwise disastrous local elections of May 1990 by stressing the good results for Conservative "flagship" councils in Westminster and Wandsworth, i.e. supposedly demonstrating that the poll tax—a source of great unpopularity for the government—could be a vote-winner for Conservative councils who kept it low. He was still Party Chairman at the time Margaret Thatcher resigned in November 1990.

Home Secretary 
After the change of regime, Baker was promoted to Home Secretary, dealing with prison riots and introducing the Dangerous Dogs Act.

After his term of office he was also found (M v Home Office 1994) to have been in contempt of court for having deported a man back to Zaire in 1991, in breach of an interim injunction and while proceedings were pending. "It would be a black day for the rule of law and the liberty of the subject", the Court of Appeal ruled, "if ministers were not accountable to the courts for their personal actions." This was the first time the courts had reached such a finding against a minister for exercise of Prerogative Powers, something previously thought to be impossible.

After 1992 

After the 1992 general election Baker left the government rather than accept demotion to the job of Welsh Secretary. He was appointed a member of the Order of the Companions of Honour (CH) on 13 April 1992. He proposed the Loyal Address in the Queen's Speech debate on 6 May 1992, following the general election.  He chose not to stand for re-election to the House of Commons in 1997, and on 16 June was created a life peer as Baron Baker of Dorking, of Iford in the County of East Sussex.

Baker was interviewed in 2012 as part of The History of Parliament's oral history project.

Since 2019, Baker has campaigned for the abolition of General Certificate of Secondary Education (GCSE) examinations, which he introduced as Secretary of State for Education. Baker believes the certificate to be redundant as it fails in creating skills wanted by employers, is incompatible with the new age 18 school leaving age and causes poor mental health in the youth. When the annual GCSE examinations were cancelled twice during the COVID-19 pandemic, Baker believed there to be increasing opposition to their return and considered it a "great opportunity" to abolish them. Baker also criticised government plans to replace Business and Technology Education Council (BTEC) qualifications with T-Levels as "vandalism", instead preferring to maintain the status quo where both BTECs and T-Levels are available to students.

In September 2019, Baker criticised attempts by Prime Minister Boris Johnson to deselect rebel Conservative MPs at the next general election.

Baker Dearing Educational Trust 
Baker was co-founder along with the late Ronald Dearing of the Baker Dearing Educational Trust, an educational trust set up to promote the establishment of University Technical Colleges in England as part of the free school programme. He is also Chair of the independent education charity Edge Foundation which campaigns for a coherent, unified and holistic education for all young people.

Personal life
He now lives in the hamlet of Iford near Lewes, East Sussex.

In 2005 he published a book on King George IV, George IV: A Life in Caricature, followed by King George III: A Life in Caricature in 2007 (Thames & Hudson). Other publications include several compilations of poetry, a history of political cartoons and his autobiography.

In 2006 Lord Baker announced that he was introducing a bill into the House of Lords to address the West Lothian question. This would prevent Scottish and Welsh MPs from voting on legislation which affects England alone as a result of devolution to the Scottish Parliament or the Welsh Assembly.

Baker's son, Oswin, is a leading member of the Greenwich and Woolwich Labour Party.

According to his entry in Who's Who, Baker enjoys collecting books and political caricatures.

In the media
Baker was interviewed about the rise of Thatcherism for the 2006 BBC TV documentary series Tory! Tory! Tory!. Baker was portrayed as a slug in the political satire television show Spitting Image.

Baker was invited on the 31 January 2023 by BBC Newsnight to comment on the forthcoming, Teachers Strike and on PM Rishi Sunak's management of his Cabinet appointments. Presenter Victoria Derbyshire, at one point was forced to remove Baker's incessantly ringing mobile phone, which continually interrupted the latter part of the live studio interview, during which he quipped that the PM was insistent in attempting to reach him.

Honours 
In 1994 Baker was awarded an Honorary Doctorate from Richmond, The American International University in London.

In 2013 he was awarded an Honorary Doctorate of Education from Plymouth University.

He was awarded an Honorary Doctorate of Education from Brunel University in 2016.

Arms

Bibliography
 George IV: A Life in Caricature (2005 Thames & Hudson )
 George III: A Life in Caricature (2007 Thames & Hudson )
 14–18 – A New Vision for Secondary Education (2013 Bloomsbury Academic )

References

External links 
 
 Kenneth Baker interview at History of Parliament Online
Kenneth Baker at the Financial Times

|-

|-

|-

|-

|-

|-

|-

Kenneth Baker, Baron}}
1934 births
Living people
20th-century British Army personnel
Alumni of Magdalen College, Oxford
British Eurosceptics
British Secretaries of State
British Secretaries of State for Education
British Secretaries of State for the Environment
Chairmen of the Conservative Party (UK)
Chancellors of the Duchy of Lancaster
Conservative Party (UK) MPs for English constituencies
Conservative Party (UK) life peers
Life peers created by Elizabeth II
Members of the Order of the Companions of Honour
Members of the Privy Council of the United Kingdom
People educated at Hampton School
People educated at St Paul's School, London
People from Newport, Wales
Presidents of the Oxford University Conservative Association
Royal Artillery officers
Secretaries of State for the Home Department
UK MPs 1966–1970
UK MPs 1970–1974
UK MPs 1974
UK MPs 1974–1979
UK MPs 1979–1983
UK MPs 1983–1987
UK MPs 1987–1992
UK MPs 1992–1997